Gutowo may refer to:

Gutowo, a sub-camp of Stutthof concentration camp
Gutowo, Brodnica County in Kuyavian-Pomeranian Voivodeship (north-central Poland)
Gutowo, Toruń County in Kuyavian-Pomeranian Voivodeship (north-central Poland)
Gutowo, Warmian-Masurian Voivodeship (north Poland)

See also
Gutow (disambiguation)
Gutów (disambiguation)